The 1983 Lower Hutt mayoral election was part of the New Zealand local elections held that same year. The elections were held for the role of Mayor of Lower Hutt plus other local government positions including sixteen city councillors, also elected triennially. The polling was conducted using the standard first-past-the-post electoral method.

Background
The incumbent Mayor, John Kennedy-Good, stood for a sixth term and was successful. The Labour Party made a modest recovery from its 1980 result, winning three extra seats. Former United Citizens councillor Don Lee severed his links with the ticket to run for the mayoralty. As an independent he was defeated for mayor as well as losing his seat on the city council and Hutt Valley Energy Board (the latter of which he was chairman of). He did however manage to retain his seat on the Wellington Regional Council (which Kennedy-Good was also elected to).

Mayoral results

Councillor results

Notes

References

Mayoral elections in Lower Hutt
1983 elections in New Zealand
Politics of the Wellington Region